Engineer is an American sludge metal band from Syracuse, New York. Featuring the brothers Bob, Brad, and Ryan Gorham, as well as the drummer Mike AuClair, the band made their debut on a split release with then-Hex Records labelmates Achilles in 2005. Their follow-up record, Reproach, was released in January 2006. Signing to Black Market Activities in 2007, the band released The Dregs and Crooked Voices in 2007 and 2011, respectively.

Engineer's music has been labeled as sludge metal, hardcore punk and metalcore. The band's third studio album, Crooked Voices, experimented with inventive song structures and arrangements, while integrating a heavier emphasis on melody and noise rock elements.

Band members
 Bobby Gorham - vocals
 Brad Gorham - bass
 Mike Auclair - drums
 Ryan Gorham - guitar

Discography
Studio albums
 Reproach (2006)
 The Dregs (2007)
 Crooked Voices (2011)

Other releases
 Suffocation of the Artisan EP (2004)
 Achilles/Engineer (2005, with Achilles)

References

External links
 

American sludge metal musical groups
Metalcore musical groups from New York (state)
Hardcore punk groups from New York (state)
Musical groups from Syracuse, New York
Sibling musical groups
Musical quartets
Heavy metal musical groups from New York (state)